Erik Axelsson (Tott) (c. 1419–1481) was a Dano-Swedish statesman and regent of Sweden under the Kalmar Union, jointly with Jöns Bengtsson Oxenstierna  in 1457 and alone from 1466 to 1467.

Biography 
He was born in Scania during the reign of King Eric of Pomerania, as the son of Axel Pedersen Thott, lord of Herlev and Lilloe, and his second wife Ingeborg Ivarsdotter. Entered the service of his mother's first cousin, King Charles VIII of Sweden (c. 1408–1470), at an early age  when Charles was  Lord High Constable and Castellan.

Erik Axelsson was the "Swedish anchor" of his family, of whom most regarded themselves as Danish subjects. His father's first wife was from Scania, a region then integral to the (Danish) kingdom. In two generations during the latter half of the 15th century, the nine Tott brothers (Axelssöner), held high and mighty positions just when Denmark and Sweden were struggling to shape the Kalmar Union, however trying to preserve their own family's position and often act in concert. A few of them changed sides in certain occasions, but mostly each of them aligned according to their most important personal landholdings. For longer periods Eric held for the Swedish crown the key Finnish castles and fiefdoms of Viborg, Tavastehus (and built Olofsborg), and was always on the  Swedish  side, accepting the Danish monarch when Swedish nobility wanted that, and supported separate state/monarchy when the Swedes wanted that. His brother, Iver Axelsen Tott, established a veritable principality for himself by taking the island of Gotland, and sometimes surrounding regions. 

Eric opposed his older kinsman the king in 1457 when he as king had gathered much dissatisfaction among Swedish high nobility. In 1467 Eric yet again supported King Charles VIII, in his third election. He acquired the former Swedish estates of the Livonian Brothers of the Sword in 1467, including Årsta Castle. As overlord of  Finland (Österland) he initiated the construction of the border fortress Olavinlinna in Savonlinna and the Vyborg town wall, both in the 1470s.

Eric Axelsson was married to  Bengta Mattsdotter  Lillie (d. 1452) and   Elin Gustavsdotter Sture (d. 1495), but died childless. His brothers Ivar Tott (d. 1487) and Laurens Axelsson  Tott (d. 1483)  survived him, inheriting most of his properties, together with his various nephews and nieces.

References

15th-century Finnish people
Rulers of Finland
Regents of Sweden
1481 deaths
People from Scania
15th-century Swedish nobility
15th-century Danish people
Year of birth unknown